Géza Fodor (2 May 1943 – 7 October 2008) was a Hungarian art and literary critic, philosopher, and dramaturge. He was one of the founding members of the Katona József Theater in Budapest. He worked at the Institute of Philosophy of the Hungarian Academy of Sciences between 1967 and 1973 and at the Faculty of Humanities of the Eötvös Loránd University thereafter.

Selected works
 Géza Fodor: Das hoffnungsloze Meisterwerk: Essays zus Musikphilosophie, Traude Junghans Verlag, Cuxhaven-Dartford, 1999.

1943 births
2008 deaths
20th-century Hungarian philosophers
Hungarian philosophers
Hungarian art critics
Hungarian literary critics
Dramaturges
20th-century Hungarian dramatists and playwrights
20th-century Hungarian male writers
Hungarian male dramatists and playwrights